Paths to Paradise is a 1925 silent comedy directed by Clarence Badger, produced by Famous Players-Lasky and distributed by Paramount Pictures. The film is based on a 1914 play, The Heart of a Thief, by Paul Armstrong, and stars Raymond Griffith and Betty Compson. The film was lost for many decades until an incomplete print surfaced in the 1970s. Essentially complete, the film is missing its final reel, which is usually filled in with synopsis by historians and film fans.

Plot
A con man posing as an undercover detective posing as a tourist from Duluth tricks the Chinatown thief Molly into giving him all of her money as a bribe to avoid arrest. Later, they decide to team up and steal a necklace. They escape from California State Police across the Mexico–United States border into Baja California, but decide to go straight, return the necklace, and settle down.

Cast
Raymond Griffith as The Dude from Duluth
Betty Compson as Molly
Thomas Santschi as Chief of Detectives Callahan
Bert Woodruff as Bride's Father
Fred Kelsey as Confederate

uncredited
Clem Beauchamp

References

External links

American silent feature films
Famous Players-Lasky films
American films based on plays
Films directed by Clarence G. Badger
1926 comedy films
Silent American comedy films
American black-and-white films
1920s rediscovered films
1925 comedy films
Rediscovered American films
Paramount Pictures films
Films set in San Francisco
Films set in Mexico
1920s American films